Dr. John A. Brown House, also known as the "Anchorage", is a historic home located at Wilmington, New Castle County, Delaware. It was built in three phases.  The core is a -story, three-bay, side-hall plan, quarried granite dwelling with late Federal detailing.  It dates to the 1820s. Attached to the core is a brick kitchen
wing. Two square multiple-story brick Italian Villa towers were added to the north gable end later in the 19th century.  Also added at this time were the stucco exterior and a columned porch.

It was added to the National Register of Historic Places in 1979.

References

Houses on the National Register of Historic Places in Delaware
Italianate architecture in Delaware
Federal architecture in Delaware
Houses completed in 1820
Houses in Wilmington, Delaware
National Register of Historic Places in Wilmington, Delaware